Rohit Phalke (born 10 October 1997) Mumbai, India is an Indian actor.

Personal life 
He got engaged to his long time friend Rachana Mulye, in a private and household ceremony on 10 October, 2020.

Education
Phalke completed his schooling from IES V. N. Sule Guruji Vidyalaya in Dadar and completed his Bachelor of Arts in Economics from D. G. Ruparel College of Arts, Science and Commerce, Matunga. He completed his Master of Arts in Economics from S K Somaiya College, Vidyavihar.

He is currently pursuing a Post Graduate Diploma in Comparative Mythology froom Mumbai University.

Career
Phalke has acted in Marathi movie Balak Palak and also in a show on Star Pravah named 'Be Dune Daha'. He has also written and directed a short film named 'Dadu' which is based on a father-daughter relationship. He was also featured in a commercial of Idea Cellular's 'No Ullu Banaoing' campaign in 2014. Rohit was also part of the Save Girls promotional campaign by Bharat Commercial.

Rohit has played one of the three leading roles in the Marathi movie Manjha, directed by Jatin Wagle, alongside Ashwini Bhave. He received the Dr. Kashinath Ghanekar Award from the Government of Maharashtra for his role as Jaideep/JD.

He has also been featured in a Cadbury Valentine's Day special TV Commercial. He also has worked in the Vijay Sales promotion commercial ad. A short film named Strawberry Shake has been premiered on Zee5 app in 2020, starring Sumeet Raghavan, Hruta Durgule and Rohit Phalke.

He was recently seen in the Marathi Film "Panghrun" released in 2022.

He now works at MIT Vishwashanti Gurukul as an economics and integrated humanities teacher.

Filmography

Television shows

Mythology 
On October 1st, 2021, Rohit started a research project 'The Purāṇa Project'. It is an ever evolving, multi-mythological project that aims to help a broad spectrum of audience ranging from enthusiasts to academics by creating mythological compendiums specializing in genealogy, legends and the understanding of the world as per the texts from which the mythologies trace their origins.

References

External links

1997 births
Living people
Indian male film actors
Indian male television actors
21st-century Indian male actors